Rusty Willoughby (born June 30, 1966) is an active American musician born in Staten Island and currently living in Vashon, Washington, a suburb of Seattle. , he has been vocalist, songwriter and guitarist or bass guitarist for several Seattle based bands: Pure Joy (1984–1989, 1997–2004), Flop (1990–1995), Llama (2005–2008), and Cobirds Unite (2010–). He also briefly played drums for the Fastbacks. He also played with Kurt Bloch of the Fastbacks, Jonathan Poneman (co-founder of the record label Sub Pop), and Scott Sutherland (of Seattle bands Model Rockets and Chemistry Set) in a Cheap Trick cover band called Sick Man of Europe, and appeared in the film Hype!, a documentary directed about the popularity of grunge rock.

Musical style 
In a 1999 review of Willoughby's self-titled solo album, Don Yates of KEXP-FM described his "Beatlesque songcraft" as "bring[ing] to mind the starker side of Elliott Smith."

Discography

Solo albums
 Rusty Willoughby self-released, 1999)
 Filament Dust (self-released, 2009)
 Cobirds Unite (self-released, 2010)
 Adult Soft Record (self-release, 2012)
 Anti (self-released, 2013)

Solo singles
 "Here Come the Weakened" / "And the World Moves On" (Sub Pop, 1999, 7-inch vinyl)

Flop albums
Flop and the Fall of the Mopsqueezer! (Frontier Records - 1992)
Whenever You're Ready (Sony 550 - 1993)
World of Today (Frontier Records - 1995)

Flop EPs and Singles
The Losing End (Lucky Records - 1990)
Drugs (Dashboard Hula Girl Records - 1990)
Anne (1993)
We Are You (Munster Records - 1993)
Regrets (Sony 550 - 1993)
The Great Valediction (Sony 550 - 1993)
Act 1 Scene 1 (Super Electro - 1995)
Place I Love (1995)

Pure Joy albums and EPs
 Pure Joy (Dwindle Music, 1986, EP)
 Carnivore (PopLlama, 1989)
 Sore Throte, Ded Goat (No Threes, 1989 or 1990, EP)
 Unsung (Flydaddy, recorded 1987, released 1994)
 Getz the Worm (Flydaddy, 1997)
 Gelatin and Bright (Book Records, 2003)

Notes

External links

 rustywilloughby.com, official web site
 Willoughby's blog
 Live performance, KEXP-FM, October 5, 2002
 Mike Baehr, Better Late: Unlovable party, Fantagraphics Books: page includes video of Willoughby performing at the Fantagraphics store February 7, 2009.

American rock musicians
Songwriters from Washington (state)
1966 births
Living people
People from Redmond, Washington
People from Staten Island
People from Vashon, Washington